Lysyl-tRNA synthetase is an enzyme that in humans is encoded by the KARS gene.

Function 

Aminoacyl-tRNA synthetases are a class of enzymes that charge tRNAs with their cognate amino acids.  Lysyl-tRNA synthetase is a homodimer localized to the cytoplasm which belongs to the class II family of tRNA synthetases.  It has been shown to be a target of autoantibodies in the human autoimmune diseases, polymyositis or dermatomyositis

Besides its role in translation, Lysyl-tRNA synthetase is involved in a signaling pathway leading to gene activation. Following physiological stimulation of a variety of cells, Lysyl-tRNA synthetase binds to the transcription factors MITF and USF2 and can then influence their transcriptional activities. Such physiological stimulation includes immunological activation of mast cells, so this pathway maybe relevant to the allergic response.

Interactions 

KARS (gene) has been shown to interact with Multisynthetase complex auxiliary component p38. Physiological trigger such as immunological activation results in the phosphorylation of LysRS on its serine residues. It separates from the multisynthetase complex and initiates Ap4A production.

References

Further reading